Kuo Yi-feng (born 24 March 1976 in Taiwan) is a Taiwanese baseball player who currently plays for Brother Elephants of Chinese Professional Baseball League. He currently plays as catcher for the Elephants. In his first professional year, he is Wei Chuan Dragons player. The next year, Wei Chuan Dragons  has disbanded, he was picked up by Brother Elephants.

Career statistics

References

External links
 

1976 births
Living people
Brother Elephants players
Wei Chuan Dragons players
2009 World Baseball Classic players
People from Taitung County